The 1991–92 season was the 93rd in the history of the Football League First Division, as well as the division's final season as the top flight of English football.

Overview

Leeds United won the last ever league championship before the Premier League was born, thanks to the efforts of players like Gordon Strachan, Lee Chapman, David Batty and Gary McAllister. On 26 April 1992, Leeds beat Sheffield United 3–2 at Bramall Lane and with the news that their challengers Manchester United lost 2–0 to Liverpool at Anfield, it confirmed them as champions.

Newly promoted Sheffield Wednesday, who were quickly emerging as one of the most feared sides in England finished in third and secured UEFA Cup qualification.

The previous season's defending champions Arsenal slipped to 4th place and never made a serious threat to retain their title. The previous season's runners-up Liverpool slipped to 6th in their first full season under the management of Graeme Souness, although they did win the FA Cup. Liverpool's Merseyside rivals Everton finished a disappointing 12th – a three-place setback on their finish the previous season.

Newly promoted West Ham United were relegated in bottom place. On 25 April 1992, West Ham's relegation was confirmed when they lost 1–0 at Coventry City. This win for Coventry also relegated Notts County – another newly promoted side – rendering their 2–0 defeat at Manchester City on the same day as academic. The last day of the season saw Luton Town lose their top flight status after ten seasons. They needed to win at Notts County and for Coventry to lose at Aston Villa. Coventry did lose 2–0 at Villa Park but unfortunately for Luton, they lost 2–1 which kept Coventry up and sent Luton down. Seventeen years later The Hatters would fall into the Conference (the 5th level of the English football system), while Notts County fell into it 10 years after them.

For much of the season, Southampton's 21-year-old striker Alan Shearer was the target of much media speculation about a move to a leading First Division club. The likes of Liverpool and Manchester United were strongly linked with his signature during the autumn, but Shearer decided to stay put on the south coast before making a decision about his future at the end of the season. Shearer was capped for the senior England side for the first time in February 1992, and scored on his debut. Another English striker who established himself as a top scorer at this level this season was the Sheffield Wednesday striker David Hirst, who had actually played in the First Division as long ago as 1986, but was now on the fringes of the England national team after scoring the goals that helped the Owls win the League Cup and an instant return to the First Division in 1990–91, and finishing among the First Division's leading scorers in 1991–92.

Manchester United's teenage winger Ryan Giggs, who had played twice for the first team the previous season, received plaudits for his outstanding performances and picked up the PFA Young Player of the Year award as well as a League Cup winner's medal, establishing himself as a regular player before his 18th birthday. Other young players who made the headlines this season were Liverpool's teenage winger Steve McManaman and new signing Rob Jones, Aston Villa's Trinidadian striker Dwight Yorke and Nottingham Forest midfielder Roy Keane.

As a wave of new names began to dominate the English game, Tottenham Hotspur's high scoring striker Gary Lineker announced in November that he would be leaving the club at the end of the season to sign for the Japanese side Grampus Eight, and also confirmed his decision to retire from the England team after the European championships that summer.

Personnel and kits
(As of May 1992)

a. Souness was absent from his duties after being diagnosed with a heart condition on 8 April 1992. Though Souness officially remained team manager, Ronnie Moran effectively took over the role for the remainder of the season.
b. Trevor Peake is understood to have been team Captain in January but it is unknown when he was appointed.

Managerial changes

League standings

Results

Top scorers

Hat-tricks

Note: (H) – Home; (A) – Away

References

RSSSF

 
Football League First Division seasons
Eng
1991–92 Football League
1991–92 in English football leagues

lt:Anglijos futbolo varžybos 1991–1992 m.